Matthias Kirste (born near Berlin), is a German cinematographer.

Internationally, Kirste is mainly known for his work on the feature-films by Alexander Tuschinski. They met when they both studied at Hochschule der Medien. Since then, they often collaborated, and both share the cinematographer-credit, either of them taking turns at operating the camera depending on the scene.

Life 

Kirste got his first film camera when he was 15 years old and did his first photographic and filmic projects as a teenager. After serving in a PsyOps unit of the German military for a number of years, he started working as a freelance photographer and cinematographer.

Notable works 
2010: Menschenliebe
2011: Mutant Calculator (short film)
2012: Hollow Date (short film)
2014: Break-Up
2016: Timeless

References

External links 
 
 Making-Of documentary about "Break-Up". (Video)
 

Living people
German cinematographers
Film people from Berlin
Year of birth missing (living people)